Westfield may refer to:

Places

Australia
Westfield, Western Australia

Canada
Grand Bay-Westfield, New Brunswick
Westfield, Nova Scotia

New Zealand
Westfield, New Zealand

United Kingdom

England
Westfield, Cumbria, a location
Westfield, East Sussex 
Westfield, Hampshire, a location
Westfield, Herefordshire, a location
Westfield, Norfolk
Westfield, Redcar, North Yorkshire
Westfield, York, North Yorkshire
Westfield, Somerset
Westfield, Sheffield, South Yorkshire
Westfield, Woking, Surrey
Westfield, Bradford, West Yorkshire
Westfield, Kirklees, a location in West Yorkshire

Scotland
Westfield, Angus, a location

Westfield, Highland
Westfield, Cumbernauld, North Lanarkshire
Westfield, West Lothian

United States
Westfield, Alabama, former settlement near Fairfield, Alabama
Westfield, Illinois
Westfield, Indiana, a city in Hamilton County
Westfield, St. Joseph County, Indiana, an unincorporated town
Westfield, Iowa
Westfield, Maine
Westfield, Massachusetts
Westfield, New Jersey
Westfield, New York, a town
Westfield (village), New York 
Westfield, Staten Island, a former town
Westfield, North Carolina, in Surry County
Westfield, Pennsylvania
Westfield, Texas
Westfield, Vermont
Westfield, West Virginia
Westfield, Wisconsin, a village
Westfield, Marquette County, Wisconsin, a town
Westfield, Sauk County, Wisconsin, a town
Westfield Center, Ohio
Westfield Corners, Illinois
Westfield River, in Massachusetts
Westfield Township (disambiguation)

Education
Westfield College, a former constituent college of the University of London
Westfield State University, a public university in Westfield, Massachusetts
Westfield School (disambiguation), several schools
Westfield High School (disambiguation), several schools in the United States

Sports
Westfield F.C. (Surrey), football club in Woking, Surrey
Westfield F.C. (Sussex), football club  in Westfield, East Sussex
Westfield Sydney to Melbourne Ultramarathon, a former marathon race

Other uses
Westfield Group, a retail property group which owned shopping centres in several countries; formed in 1960 and split in 2014
Westfield Corporation, formed in a corporate spin-off in 2014 and defunct in 2018
Unibail-Rodamco-Westfield, formed in a corporate merger in 2018
Westfield London, a shopping centre in White City, London
Westfield Stratford City, a shopping centre near the Olympic Park in Stratford, London
Westfield (surname)
Westfield (guitars), a Scottish-based guitar company, started in 1989
Westfield Health, a health insurance company based in the UK
Westfield Insurance
Westfield Sportscars
USS Westfield (1861), a sidewheel steam ferryboat during the American Civil War
"Westfield", a song by Bladee from Red Light